Thomas Løvenkrands (born 30 May 1974) is a Danish former professional football player. He most recently played as a winger for Danish club SønderjyskE. He is the older brother of Danish international winger Peter Løvenkrands.

Career
Løvenkrands began his career at Akademisk Boldklub (AB) in the top-flight Danish Superliga in 1998, playing alongside his brother Peter Løvenkrands. He joined Scottish club St Johnstone in May 2000, after impressing then-manager Sandy Clark during a testimonial match for veteran Saints forward Roddy Grant. After the Perth club was relegated from the Scottish Premier League in 2002, they could no longer offer Løvenkrands a similar pay deal, leading to his departure from the club in the summer of 2003.

He returned to Denmark to join Superliga club Esbjerg fB. Struggling to win a place in the starting line-up, he left the club in the summer 2006 to join league rivals SønderjyskE. In December 2007 he decided to end his career.

Later career
Since returning from professional football, Løvenkrads played in the Danish eight division, for Esbjerg fB's second team in the Jutland Series and later also in the Danish Series 1 for Sædding/G IF, where he - among others - played for former professional Jesper Lange and his own son, Christian Løvenkrands. As of January 2021, 46-year old Løvenkrads was still active as a player for Sædding/G IF.

References

External links

Career statistics at Danmarks Radio

1974 births
Living people
Danish men's footballers
Danish Superliga players
Akademisk Boldklub players
St Johnstone F.C. players
Esbjerg fB players
SønderjyskE Fodbold players
Scottish Premier League players
Danish expatriate men's footballers
Expatriate footballers in Scotland
Association football wingers
People from Hørsholm Municipality
Allerød FK players
IF Skjold Birkerød players
Sportspeople from the Capital Region of Denmark